Earl Frederick "Spider" Balfour (January 4, 1933 – April 27, 2018) was a Canadian ice hockey player. He played in the National Hockey League from 1952 to 1961 with the Toronto Maple Leafs and Chicago Black Hawks. He was a defensive forward and penalty-killing expert. Balfour won the Stanley Cup with Chicago in 1961. He retired after 288 games, posting 30 goals, 22 assists, 52 points and just 78 penalty minutes. He died April 27, 2018 after having lived in the Cambridge, Ontario area.

Career statistics

Regular season and playoffs

Awards and achievements
 OHA-Sr. Second All-Star Team (1965, 1966, 1967)
 1961  Stanley Cup championship  (Chicago Black Hawks)

References

External links

1933 births
2018 deaths
Canadian ice hockey left wingers
Chicago Blackhawks players
Ontario Hockey Association Senior A League (1890–1979) players
Pittsburgh Hornets players
Rochester Americans players
Ice hockey people from Toronto
Stanley Cup champions
Toronto Maple Leafs players
Toronto Marlboros players